Noon chai, also called  Kashmiri tea, pink tea, gulabi chai, Namkeen chai,, and  Sheer chai is a traditional tea beverage originating in Kashmir. It is made with gunpowder tea (green tea leaves rolled into small balls), milk and baking soda.

Etymology
The word noon means 'salt' in several Indian languages, such as Kashmiri, Bengali, Rajasthani, Hindi and Nepali. It is used in several other terms, such as the noon-dab ("salt promise") custom of Rajasthan, where a hand is dipped in salt to signify a solemn promise.

Kashmiri Hindus refer to this Kashmiri tea as "Sheer chai". "Shir", the term from which "Sheer chai" is derived from, means "milk" in Farsi.

"Tea pink" is also used as an adjective referencing the characteristic pink hue of the tea, such as to describe textiles.

Preparation
Noon chai is traditionally made from green tea leaves, milk, salt and baking soda, and is usually cooked in a samavar. The leaves are boiled for about an hour with baking soda until it develops a burgundy colouration, then ice or cold water is added to "shock" it and make it stay that colour. When milk is added, it combines with the burgundy to yield its signature pink colour. It is then aerated by ladling out some of it and pouring it back into the pot to incorporate tiny air bubbles into it, a process that yields a froth and that may take hours to do by hand.

Many shops will not undertake such a labour-intensive process in order to create a red hue, instead using an instant Kashmiri chai mix or adding red food colouring to imitate the pink colour.

Sugar is not traditionally used in Kashmiri recipes, although newer commercial preparations in many restaurants around the world and tea stalls that serve Kashmiri cuisine may include sweeteners or exclude salt. In Pakistan, it is often served with sugar and nuts.

Chemistry
When tea leaves are boiled, molecules called polyphenols are extracted from the leaves into the water. In green teas like those used in Noon chai, the polyphenols extracted act similar to the substance phenol red, which changes color depending on the pH level of the substance it is in—yellow when it is acidic, and red when it is alkaline. Since Noon chai is boiled for a long time, a lot of color-changing polyphenols are extracted from the leaves. When alkaline baking soda (sodium bicarbonate) is added to it, the tea takes on its deep red color (which then turns pink with milk).

History

Origin
Origin stories of the tea allege that it came from Yarkland (which later became Xinjiang, China) to Kashmir through the Silk Road. Noon chai originates from the Himalayas, where salt was added as an electrolyte to prevent dehydration at high altitudes. It is also related to other Central Asian salty milk teas, such as the Uyghur tea etkanchay and the Mongolian tea suutei tsai.

Use of alkaline salts, like baking soda, in tea originated from the Tibetan plateau, where naturally-occurring deposits of soda were used to darken po cha. Later, in Ladakh, eastern Kashmir, hot spring soda crystals were used in local butter tea, or gur gur cha. Residents of Kashmir Valley adopted the practice from Ladakh, importing soda (called phul) from them and brick tea from Lhasa, then replacing yak butter with milk and cream to fit local tastes.

Cultural significance
Noon chai is popularly consumed numerous times per day in Kashmir, served with breads such as kulcha, girda, or tsochwor. 

In the month of Ramadan, Sheer chai is widely sold and served in Patna, Bihar, notably in the central district of Sabzibagh ("vegetable garden").

See also
 Kashmiri cuisine
 Butter tea
 Kulhar
 Masala chai

References

External links
 Traditional noon chai recipe

Kashmiri cuisine
Indo-Caribbean cuisine
Blended tea
Tea culture